is a Japanese politician of the Liberal Democratic Party, a member of the House of Councillors in the Diet (national legislature). A native of Wakayama Prefecture, he graduated from Waseda University and received a master's degree in corporate communications from Boston University. He was elected to the House of Councillors for the first time in 1998. He was elevated by Prime Minister Shinzo Abe to serve as Minister of Economy, Trade and Industry (METI) from 3 August 2016 to 11 September 2019. As a Minister, he played a crucial role for announcing the export restrictions against South Korea in 2019.

Honours
 : Grand Officer of the Order of Orange-Nassau (29 October 2014)

References

External links 
  in Japanese.

Members of the House of Councillors (Japan)
Waseda University alumni
Boston University College of Communication alumni
Living people
1962 births
Liberal Democratic Party (Japan) politicians
Government ministers of Japan